Rusan may refer to:

Rusan, Albania, village in southern Albania in the Delvinë District
Ruşan, village and municipality in the Ismailli Rayon of Azerbaijan
Ferdo Rusan (1810 - 1879), Croatian reformer, composer and musician 
Timothy Rusan (born 1977), American triple jumper